HMVS Victoria is the name of two ships serving in the Victorian Naval Forces, the colonial navy of the colony of Victoria, Australia, which is also the ships' namesake:

 , a sloop-of-war launched in 1855
 , a gunboat launched in 1884

See also
 , four ships of the Royal Navy